is a member of the Japanese Communist Party serving in the House of Representatives as a representative of the Southern Kanto proportional representation block, a position she was elected to in 2014. She is against the Trans-Pacific Partnership, a proposal which she thinks will negatively affect farmers in Japan.

References

Living people
Japanese communists
Japanese Communist Party politicians
Members of the House of Representatives (Japan)
Year of birth missing (living people)